The Government College of Engineering, Cherthala (Malayalam: കോളേജ് ഓഫ് എഞ്ചിനീയറിംഗ്, ചേര്‍ത്തല ) is an engineering college in the state of Kerala, India, established by Government of Kerala in 2004, under the propitious of the Institute of Human Resources Development (IHRD) 

and is recognized by the All India Council for Technical Education,  New Delhi. The college is affiliated  to APJ Abdul Kalam Technological University.

The college is located at Pallippuram, close to the heart of Cherthala, is sufficiently removed from the hustle and bustle to provide a serene environment for higher learning. The college is surrounded by vegetation and greenery providing a panoramic view of the Vembanadu lake and is close to the newly set up InfoPark Smart Space at Pallippuram

Courses
Four-year B.Tech. degrees in:
 Computer Science and Engineering (formerly Computer Engineering) accredited by NBA through academic year 2022-23
 Electronics and Communication Engineering (formerly Electronics Engineering)
 Electrical and Electronics Engineering (formerly Electrical Engineering)
Two year postgraduate M.Tech course in:
 Electronics Engineering (Specialization in Signal Processing) 
 Computer Science & Engineering (Specialization in Computer & Information Science)

Admission
Undergraduate programmes
The admission for both the merit quota and management quota is purely based on the rank secured in the All Kerala Engineering Entrance Examination conducted by the Commissioner for Entrance Examinations, Govt. of Kerala. The difference between the merit quota and management quota is in the amount of fees that have to be paid by the candidates.35k for merit holders(2020). 15% of the seats are reserved for NRIs; the admission is based on the merit in the qualifying examination.

Post graduate programmes 
Through Graduate Aptitude Test in Engineering exam administered and conducted jointly by the Indian Institute of Science and the Indian Institutes of Technology on behalf of the National Coordination Board – GATE, Department of Higher Education, Ministry of Human Resource Development (MHRD), Government of India.

Annual intake 
CECTL has an annual intake of 270 students (+10% lateral entry students) through Government allotment, divided among the two branches as follows:

B.TECH 

 Computer Science and Engineering: 90 seats (+10% lateral entry students)
 Electronics and Communication Engineering: 60 seats (+10% lateral entry students)
 Electrical and electronics engineering:60 seats (+10% lateral entry students)

M.TECH 
 Computer Science Engineering (Computer & Information Science): 18 seats

Student activities

College Senate 
The members of the College Senate are elected by and from the students of the college. The College Senate consists of elected representatives from each class and lady representatives from each year. The College Senate has an executive committee consisting of chairman, Vice-chairman, General Secretary, Treasurer, Editor, Sports Club Secretary and Arts Club Secretary. The tenure of office of the College Senate is one academic year. The objective of the Senate is to train the students in the responsibilities of citizenship, to promote opportunities for development of character among students, to organize debates, seminars and tours and to encourage educational and social activities.

Technical and non-technical organizations 

IEEE
IEDC
NSS
Nature Club
Arts and Sport club
AECES
CSI

Arts and sports 
The arts and sports festivals conducted every year by the college senate. The College Senate will divide students into 4 houses, each having one captain and a vice captain. There will be a college inauguration ceremony for Arts and Sports festivals.

Noticeable Achievements in Arts and Sports
 2012-2013 Champions of intra IHRD 5s football tournament, by College Of Enngineering, Chengannur 
 2013-2014 Runners up of CUSAT university football tournament
 2013-2014 Inter college  7s football tournament  runners up, at Model Enngineering College, Thrikkakara
 2014-2015 Champions of inter college 5s football tournament, College Of Enngineering, Karunagappally
 2015-2016 Champions of intra ihrd 5s football tournament, College Of Enngineering, Chengannur

Training and Placement cell
Training and Placement Cell functions as a launching platform for the qualified candidates to make their dreams a reality. TPC is guided by the placement officer with faculties from all the departments and is enriched by students members. TPC prepares the students to face competitive examination and interviews through intensive training programs encompassing aptitude tests, group discussions, mock interviews and basics of behavioral psychology and body language. TPC also assists the students in career planning and employment strategies. It invites reputed companies to the college and organize campus placement session.

Placement Details

See also
Cochin University of Science and Technology
Model Engineering College
College of Engineering Chengannur
College of Engineering Adoor
College of Engineering Karunagappally
College of Engineering Poonjar
College of Engineering Kallooppara
College of Engineering Attingal
College of Engineering kottarakkara
Institute of Human Resources Development
List of Engineering Colleges in Kerala
Cherthala

References

External links
College website
Cochin University of Science And Technology official website
APJ Abdul Kalam Technological University
The Institute of Human Resource Development Kerala official website

Engineering colleges in Kerala
All India Council for Technical Education
Institute of Human Resources Development
Universities and colleges in Alappuzha district
Educational institutions established in 2004
2004 establishments in Kerala